Alara Kalama (Pāḷi & Sanskrit ,  was a hermit and a teacher of ancient  meditation. He was a teacher of Śramaṇa thought and, according to the Pāli Canon scriptures, the first teacher of Gautama Buddha.

History 
After Siddhartha Gautama became an ascetic, he went to Alara Kalama, who was a teacher that taught a kind of early meditation at Vessali. Alara taught Siddhartha meditation, especially a dhyānic state called the "sphere of nothingness".

Gautama eventually equalled Alara, who could not teach him more, saying, "You are the same as I am now. There is no difference between us. Stay here and take my place and teach my students with me." Gautama was not interested in staying. After leaving, the Siddhartha found a new teacher, Uddaka Rāmaputta.

References

Bibliography 

 

Early Buddhism
Ancient Indian philosophers
Ascetics
Indian yoga teachers